Mohammad Imran can refer to:

 Mohammad Imran (cricketer, born 1989), Pakistani cricketer
 Mohammad Imran (cricketer, born 1990), Pakistani cricketer
 Mohammad Imran (cricketer, born 1996), Pakistani cricketer
 Mohammad Imran (cricketer, born 2001), Pakistani cricketer
 Muhammad Imran (footballer) (born 1986), Pakistani footballer